The Moxotó goat breed from northeastern Brazil is used for the production of meat.  It is a color type selected from the Chué goat breed.

Sources
Moxotó Goat

Goat breeds
Meat goat breeds
Goat breeds originating in Brazil